Cross Generation Entertainment or CrossGen was an American comic book publisher and entertainment company that operated from 1998 to 2004. The company's assets were acquired by The Walt Disney Company in 2004, and designated to Disney Publishing Worldwide. In July 2010, Disney re-established the brand through Marvel Comics, who announced plans to revive CrossGen titles.

History
CrossGen Comics, Inc., was founded in 1998, in Tampa, Florida, by entrepreneur Mark Alessi.

In 1999, the company acquired the Orlando-based multi-genre fan convention MegaCon, from founder James Breitbiel. Breitbiel became CrossGen's Marketing and Distribution Director.

In January 2000, CrossGen Comics, Inc. debuted with CrossGenesis, a sneak-peek at the CrossGen universe. It provided an outline of the universe, worlds, and characters of CrossGen's flagship titles that would be released six months later. Gina M. Villa, head of creative departments, and Mark Alessi wrote a history of the Sigilverse before any comics were written. The head creative team consisted of Barbara Kesel, Mark Waid and Ron Marz. Unlike other comics publishers such as DC Comics and Marvel Comics, which rely mainly on freelance writers and artists, most of CrossGen's talent were salaried employees of the company and worked out of its headquarters in Oldsmar, Florida. Later creators such as J.M. DeMatteis worked freelance, with CrossGen publishing finished properties. The company's publications covered a variety of genres with characters inhabiting a single shared universe.

First wave
The first wave of CrossGen titles included: Sigil, a military science fiction space opera; Mystic, a magical fantasy; Meridian, flavored by traditional folklore;
Scion, an adventure series inspired by tales of King Arthur; and CrossGen Chronicles, a series detailing the "untold" history of the CrossGen universe.

The protagonists of the first wave of CrossGen comics were linked in commonality by the Sigil each character had received. It was a branding on their body, a marking that granted them unusual powers. The Sigil, and the story of the Sigil-Bearers, was a prominent aspect of the narrative.

Following titles
In November 2000, the Homeric myth The First was released and, steadily over the next three years, CrossGen released many more titles.

The following were released in 2001: Crux (based on the Atlantean myth); Sojourn (an epic fantasy in the style of The Lord of the Rings); Ruse (a Victorian detective story); and Negation.

In the following year, these titles were released: the horror story Route 666; the wuxia comedy Way of the Rat; and the samurai drama The Path.

The company enjoyed great initial success, with fifteen Harvey Award nominations in 2002.

In 2003, other titles were released expanding the fictional universe: the sword and sorcery epic Brath;
Chimera, a limited series about a Sigil-bearer on the far reaches of the Universe; the pirate adventure El Cazador; and two other titles that explain the origin of the Sigil-bearers, Solus and Mark of Charon.

Titles such as Negation and Crux blended genres. Although most CrossGen titles shared common elements (such as a Sigil, the presence of a Mentor and a member of the god-like First), the titles rarely crossed over with each other. The major example of crossing over was Sam of Sigil, who spent four issues in the world of Brath and part of one issue in the world of Meridan, with the latter period also being told from Sephie's perspective in issue #20 of Meridan. There was one company-crossover event, the Negation War, but was never concluded.

CrossGen Entertainment, Inc. (CGE)

In 2003, CrossGen Comics, Inc. changed its name to CrossGen Entertainment, Inc. (CGE), and formed eleven wholly owned subsidiary companies, which represented its broad-based entertainment products and offerings. These companies were to act independently of CGE, functioning as interior business units while all working towards CGE's overall goals. With this arrangement, all current and future projects would be managed and guided by Crossgen's founding principles. These projects consisted of:

 CrossGen Intellectual Property, LLC: CGIP held all CGE content intellectual property (IP).
 CrossGen Technologies, LLC: CGT held all CGE technology IP and managed technology IP creation, development, production, and application.
 CrossGen Publishing, LLC: CGPub published all print projects, including CGE Ancillary, Code 6, CrossGen Universe, and foreign publishing.
 Code 6 Comics, LLC: A subsidiary of CGPub, C6C published Code 6 publications.
 CrossGen Comics, LLC: A subsidiary of CGPub, CGC published CGU print publications.
 CrossGen Media, LLC: CGM was responsible for feature films, television programs, video games, websites, merchandise, and additional interactive products.
 CrossGen Productions, LLC: A subsidiary of CGM, CGP was to produce feature films and television programs.
 CrossGen Interactive, LLC: A subsidiary of CGM, CGI was responsible for interactive publishing, video games, and role-playing games.
 MegaCon, LLC: MGC managed the MegaCon convention.
 CrossGen Education, LLC: CGEd published educational materials.
 Comics On The Web, LLC: COW was responsible for Internet publishing, including Comics On The Web.

CrossGen Comics Entertainment, Inc.(CGE) was set up to take over the publishing of all existing comics properties. Its logo would appear on anything that came from CrossGen. CGE acted as a publisher for affiliated companies that would retain full ownership and control of their property and would reap the benefits of joining with a larger company.

Code6

Code6 was another imprint of CrossGen Entertainment created to publish titles set outside of the Sigilverse, such as The Red Star, Demonwars, and The Crossovers. All titles published with the Code6 logo would be owned by both the creator and CrossGen Entertainment, Inc. with the majority of ownership resting with CGE. CrossGen would pay an upfront page rate and then split all rights and revenues 75%-25%.

Code6 is the Florida Police signal code for an escaped prisoner. It was used to describe the attitude of the creators working at Code6.

Comics on the Web (COW)
One of Crossgen's innovations was the sale of comic subscriptions via the Internet. Subscribers could view all of Crossgen's titles through a web browser. The web comics reproduced the fine color of the original, but the lettering was sometimes not quite legible; hovering over the word or thought bubble caused it to enlarge to a readable size, a feature developed in Flash by Gabo Mendoza of Gabocorp Studios. The online library was estimated to contain 160 issues and 4,400 pages by the end of 2002. CrossGen was among the first comics companies to publish online.

Bankruptcy
In 2003, CrossGen found itself in a scandal over freelancer payments, exposing systemic financial problems. As the news reached comics fans, sales were affected and creative staff, such as Gina Villa, Brandon Peterson, and Ron Marz, began to abandon the company.

Some industry observers noted that the company's difficulties became apparent shortly after the Borders and Barnes & Noble bookstore chains discontinued stocking CrossGen's trade paperback collections, and returned huge numbers of unsold books for credit/refund, more than wiping out the publisher's optimistically low reserves against returns. In an interview with Marc Alessi on the Dollar Bin podcast, the root cause of CrossGen's financial collapse was said to be the result of a large decrease in the value of Perot Systems stock that was largely backing the company's financing. The financial plan was to lose money in the first six years before earning profits in the seventh year through movie and television deals.

In late 2003 the company restructured, selling MegaCon to show organizer Elizabeth Widera.

CrossGen filed for bankruptcy in June 2004 and ceased publishing, leaving titles such as Sojourn, Negation War, Brath, and many others cancelled mid-story.

In July 2004, Disney Publishing was interested in licensing CrossGen content but, upon discovering the company's bankruptcy, began seeking to acquire its assets instead. Founder Alessi loaned the company $75,000, but was unable to prevent the company's takeover. On November 15, Disney purchased CrossGen's assets for $1 million with plans to publish four prose hardcover novels based on writer J.M. DeMatteis and artist Mike Ploog's Abadazad.

CGCreators.net was created to attempt to track the subsequent doings of various staff associated with the company. It has since ceased operations.

As of 2008, various CrossGen domain names and URLs were held by cybersquatters.

Checker Books
In 2006, Checker Books obtained the rights to publish trade collections of various CrossGen series, starting with Sojourn. A total of nine collected editions were part of the agreement: two each for Sojourn, Negation, and Scion, and single volumes for The Way of the Rat, Sigil, and The Path. There are no plans by Checker Books for more traveler-sized collections.

Mark Thompson, the publisher of Checker Books, traveled to New York in 2007 and spoke with Disney representatives about reprinting further collections. No agreement has been made at the time, but according to Mark Thompson, he indicated that this would happen. In a quick follow-up interview he expanded on things, explaining how difficult it has been to pin down what is considered 'full distributed' and to solve this they are: "planning to propose to Disney that we 'catch up' by putting out omnibus collections".

In 2008, Checker Books published three CrossGen titles. These were:

Negation Hounded, Vol. 3 (writer Tony Bedard, illustrator Paul Pelletier, 172 pages)
 Sigil V. 6 Planetary Union (writer Chuck Dixon illustrator Scott Eaton, 172 pages)
 Sojourn Volume 6 - The Berzerker's Tale (writer Ian Edginton, illustrator Greg Land, 172 pages)

Revival
In July 2010, Marvel Comics' editor-in-chief Joe Quesada announced at the San Diego Comic-Con that Marvel (also a Disney-owned company) would revive a number of CrossGen titles.

Marvel began to publish Ruse and Sigil in March 2011 as four-issue miniseries. Both completed their run, and a third Crossgen title, Mystic, premiered in August 2011. Two more books, Route 666 and Kiss Kiss Bang Bang, were announced during Fan Expo Canada in late August, and were set to start in February 2012, but were never published due to low interest in the previously released series.

In August 2022, Marvel Comics announced CrossGen Tales #1, a trade paperback collection that contains the reprinted original first issues of Mystic, Sigil, Ruse, and Soujourn. This would be the first time that CrossGen titles would be available in a digital format.  In October 2022, an omnibus collection of the original Sigil series was announced with an anticipated release scheduled for Summer 2023.

Titles

Sigilverse
The majority of CrossGen's titles took place within a shared universe, informally dubbed the Sigilverse by CrossGen fans. CrossGen published the following titles in the Sigilverse. Most titles are listed in order of appearance. Mini-series and one-shots associated with an ongoing title are listed thereunder.

CrossGen collected several of the above titles in trade paperback format.

Compendia
CrossGen published two monthly anthologies, referred to as compendia, that reprinted several titles from the main shared continuity. Each issue contained between 6 and 11 issues.
 Forge (13 issues, reprints of Crux, Meridian, Negation, Sojourn, The Path, Route 666)
 Edge/Vector (13 issues, reprints of The First, Mystic, Ruse, Scion, Sigil, Way of the Rat, and Solus)
After 12 issues, Edge was renamed Vector due to a trademark conflict with another company. A third compendium called Caravan was never released.

Roughly halfway through the run of the compendia, their format changed from standard comic size to a half-page sized digest format, usually with a higher page count. CrossGen later used this compendium format to collect runs of single titles, such as Meridian and The Path, to reported success.

Promotional and related titles
 CrossGen Sampler (a free promotional comic which included several pages from each of CrossGen's first five titles)
 CrossGen Primer (a promotional comic bundled with an issue of Wizard magazine)
 Wizard CrossGen Special (a later promotional comic bundled with Wizard magazine)
 CrossGen Illustrated (softcover book with art and information on several Sigilverse titles)
 Pre-release Reader review copies of the first issue of several series, some in black and white.

Additional titles
In addition to its Sigilverse comics, CrossGen published a number of additional titles:

Notes

References

CrossGen at the Big Comic Book DataBase

Checker Book Publishing Group, who are reprinting some of the CrossGen material

 
Defunct comics and manga publishing companies
Companies based in Tampa, Florida
Marvel Comics imprints
Disney Publishing Worldwide
Disney acquisitions
Publishing companies established in 1998
1998 establishments in Florida
Publishing companies disestablished in 2004
2004 disestablishments in Florida